Lowville (also Lordville) is an unincorporated community in Lowville Township, Murray County, Minnesota, United States.

History
Bartlett Marshall Low (1839-1893), Minnesota state legislator, farmer, and business, lived in Lowville with his wife and family.

Notes

Unincorporated communities in Murray County, Minnesota
Unincorporated communities in Minnesota